Jesús Taboada (born 12 July 1940) is an Argentine fencer. He competed in the team and individual foil and épée events at the 1964 Summer Olympics.

References

1940 births
Living people
Argentine male fencers
Argentine épée fencers
Argentine foil fencers
Olympic fencers of Argentina
Fencers at the 1964 Summer Olympics